The Allman Joys was an early band with Duane and Gregg Allman fronting. It was originally the Escorts, but it eventually evolved into the Allman Joys. Duane Allman quit high school to spend his days at home practicing guitar. They auditioned for Bob Dylan's producer, Bob Johnston, at Columbia Records, backing a girl trio called The Sandpipers.  Eventually, they went on to form the group Hour Glass and then the Allman Brothers Band.

Members
Gregg Allman - Organ, Lead Vocals
Duane Allman - Lead guitar, Vocals
Bobby Dennis - Rhythm Guitar
Jack Jackson - Rhythm Guitar
Mabron McKinney - Bass guitar
Ralph Bollinger -Bass guitar
Bill Connell - drums
Bob Keller - Bass guitar
Ronnie Wilkins - Piano
Charlie Winkler - Guitar
Allison Miner - Vocals
Maynard Portwood - Drums
Doug Montague - Bass guitar
Mike Alexander - Bass guitar
George Henderson - Bass guitar

Story
From the back of the Early Allman compilation (Allman Joys - Early Allman):

Note: Loudermilk's memory is slightly inaccurate, since Duane did not learn to play slide guitar until his birthday in 1968, a couple of years later.

Discography
Early Allman – Featuring Duane and Gregg Allman (compilation album, 1973)

References

External links

Further reading

Musical groups established in 1965
Musical groups disestablished in 1967
The Allman Brothers Band